Bade is a surname. Notable people with the surname include:

Alexander Bade (born 1970), German footballer
Jean-Pierre Bade (born 1960), French footballer
Josse Bade or Jodocus Badius (1462–1535), French printer
Lance Bade (born 1971), American target shooter
Rachael Bade (born 1989), American journalist
William F. Badè (1871–1936), American author and scholar
William G. Bade (1924–2012), American mathematician